Sergei Gribanov (born 2 January 1986) is a Russian former professional ice hockey forward.

Gribanov played in the Russian Superleague for SKA Saint Petersburg, HC MVD and Vityaz Chekov, as well as its successor Kontinental Hockey League for Metallurg Novokuznetsk.

References

External links

1986 births
Living people
Ariada Volzhsk players
Avtomobilist Yekaterinburg players
HC Berkut players
HC CSK VVS Samara players
Dizel Penza players
HC Izhstal players
HK Lida players
Metallurg Novokuznetsk players
Metallurg Zhlobin players
HC MVD players
Neftyanik Almetyevsk players
HK Neman Grodno players
People from Lipetsk
Russian ice hockey forwards
HC Rys players
SKA Saint Petersburg players
Sputnik Nizhny Tagil players
HC Vityaz players
Yermak Angarsk players